

Winners 
Most Awards

See also 

 National Film Awards
 Kerala State Film Award

References

External links 
 http://www.keralafilm.com/

Kerala State Film Awards
2012 Indian film awards